Devil is the second extended play by South Korean singer Max. It was released on January 13, 2022, by SM Entertainment. The EP contains six tracks including the lead single of the same name. The physical album is available in two photobook versions.

Background and release
On December 28, 2021, SM Entertainment announced that Max would release his second solo EP in January 2022.

On January 3, 2022, the release date of Devil was announced as January 13, 2022.

Composition
The title song “Devil” is a slow R&B song that blends groovy drums, grand bass riffs and heavy a cappella chorus to create an overwhelming atmosphere featuring Max's colourful ad-libs and delicate vocal techniques that express the exploding emotions. The lyrics written by Max is said to be enough to feel the intense charisma with the will to move forward confidently without giving in to the devil's whispers even in a difficult reality.

Track listing

Charts

Weekly charts

Monthly charts

Release history

References

2022 EPs
SM Entertainment EPs
Korean-language EPs
Changmin albums